Turnwold, located near Eatonton, Georgia, was built in 1860.  It was listed on the National Register of Historic Places in 1980. The property then included five contributing buildings and three contributing sites.

It is located southeast of Eatonton on Old Phoenix Rd.

It includes two historic plantation houses.  Also included are a detached kitchen, a mid-nineteenth-century academy, and a late nineteenth-century tenant house. The sites are two family cemeteries associated with the plantation houses, and the site of a printing shop.

The oldest of the two houses is the Alexander-Turner House, a Plantation Plain-style house built on a slight rise of ground.  It is two-stories tall, with a one-story ell to the rear.

The other is the Lane-Turner House, a Federal-style two-over-two house with a hipped roof.  This was in poor condition in 1979.

The school is the Phoenix Academy.

References

National Register of Historic Places in Georgia (U.S. state)
Federal architecture in Georgia (U.S. state)
Greek Revival architecture in Georgia (U.S. state)
Buildings and structures completed in 1860
Putnam County, Georgia